Redemption Day is a 2021 American action thriller film directed and co-written by Hicham Hajji. The film stars Gary Dourdan, Serinda Swan, Andy García, Martin Donovan, Robert Knepper and Samy Naceri and follows the U.S. Marine who travels to Morocco to rescue his kidnapped wife. It was distributed by Saban Films.

Plot
U.S. Marine Corps Captain Brad Paxton is living with his wife Kate, an archeologist, and a daughter in New York City.  He is still haunted by the nightmare of his service in Syria. After giving a speech in a conference, Kate travels to Morocco for an archaeological mission, where she meets French-Algerian archaeologist Jean Rashidi. When Kate and her team drive to find an ancient city hidden under the desert, they realize that they have inadvertently crossed the border of Algeria. The local insurgents arrive and kidnap Kate, Jean and Moroccan Amir Jadid. Jadid is released later.

Brad receives news about Kate and travels to Rabat, where he meets a Cabinet member of the Moroccan government, a liaison Younes Laalej, a former U.S. Army soldier, served together with Brad. U.S. Ambassador Williams reluctantly agrees to join Younes and Brad in the operation to gather intel, despite Tom Fitzgerald's objections. The embassy discloses that the terrorist leader Jaafar El Hadi is wanted by Interpol for and has been in hiding. Meanwhile, El Hadi and his comrades vote to kill Kate if the ten million dollar ransom is not paid after their evening prayer.

With the help of the counter-terrorism agency, they manage to track the whereabouts to El Hadi's compound in Abadla. Brad and Younes embark the hour-long drive there. After Younes sends the coordinates of the compound, Williams asks the U.S. President to send NAVY SEALs to assist them in the operation. At night, Brad and Younes manage to kill most of the men, and Brad finds and hides Kate. The terrorists kill Jean after the French government fails to pay the ransom. When the two are confronted by El Hadi, he forces Younes to order the government to transfer the $10 million ransom into El Hadi's offshore account. As El Hadi attempts to escape, the SEALs arrive and kill El Hadi and his remaining men. Before leaving, Brad and Younes blow up the compound but get incapacitated; presuming that they are dead, the SEALs rescue Kate and fly away.

The next day, Brad reunites with Kate at the Algeria–Morocco border. Later, Jadid meets Fitz, who compliments the former's bravery and grants him an American citizenship and a CIA asset. However, Jadid is killed on his way out, revealing that Fitz is a lobbyist for the oil company which also finances the terrorist networks. Fitz also presumes that Brad and Younes were killed in action. As he and his associates get out of the building, Younes spies on them and texts Brad of their corruption.

Cast
 Gary Dourdan as Brad Paxton
 Serinda Swan as Kate Paxton
 Andy García as Ambassador Williams
 Brice Bexter as Younes Laalej
 Ernie Hudson as Ed Paxton
 Martin Donovan as Tom Fitzgerald
 Robert Knepper as Mysterious Oil Lobbyist
 Samy Naceri as Jaafar El Hadi
 Yassine Azzouz as Amir Jadid
 Lilia Hajji as Clair Paxton
 Brahim Rachiki as Jean Rashidi

Reception
On review aggregator Rotten Tomatoes, the film holds an approval rating of 13% based on 23 reviews.

Joe Leydon of  Variety gave it a negative review: "If 'Redemption Day' were any more generic, the first thing you'd see on screen would be a bar code in place of the opening credits."

References

External links
 

2021 films
American action thriller films
Films set in Morocco
Films set in Algeria
Films set in New York City
Films about terrorism
Films about kidnapping
2020s American films